The Government of the Czech Republic from April 25, 2005 to September 4, 2006 was formed by coalition of the Czech Social Democratic Party (ČSSD), the Christian and Democratic Union - Czechoslovak People's Party (KDU-ČSL) and the Freedom Union - Democratic Union (US-DEU). Two members of the cabinet were women.

Czech government cabinets
Czech Social Democratic Party
KDU-ČSL
Freedom Union – Democratic Union
Coalition governments of the Czech Republic